The 1940 NCAA Golf Championship was the second annual NCAA-sanctioned golf tournament to determine the individual and team national champions of men's collegiate golf in the United States. The tournament was held at the Ekwanok Country Club in Manchester, Vermont. 

LSU and Princeton shared the team championship, the first for both programs. Dixon Brooke from Virginia captured the individual title. The Tigers from LSU were coached by Mike Donahue and the Tigers from Princeton by Walter Bourne.

John P. Burke (Georgetown), with a score of 143, was the tournament's medalist.

Team results

Note: Top 10 only

References

NCAA Men's Golf Championship
Golf in Vermont
NCAA Golf Championship
NCAA Golf Championship
NCAA Golf Championship